Jessie Kabwila-Kapasula is a Malawian academic, feminist, educator and activist. Her scholarship focuses on African feminism.

Kabwila-Kapasula was the acting president of the Chancellor College Academic Staff Union that was fired during the standoff to ensure academic freedom at the University of Malawi that hasn't been resolved. She is one of the fired lecturers at the center of the standoff for academic freedom that occurred at University of Malawi (UNIMA) that resulted in her dismissal. This prompted protests from the UNIMA students and faculty that stood in solidarity with Kabwila-Kapasula and the eventual closure of the university. It led to a standoff between President Bingu wa Mutharika and the lecturers. Her dismissal centering academic freedom was also one of the events that led to the July 20th, 2011 protests.

Early career
Kabwila-Kapasula earned a doctorate in comparative literature from Binghamton University, where she served as President of the Graduate Student Organization in 2008-2009.

Academic Freedom Standoff
The standoff began when Blessings Chinsinga, an associate political science professor, was interrogated by Peter Mukhito, Malawi’s Inspector General of Police, about a parallel he drew in a lecture between Malawi’s fuel crisis and popular uprisings in Tunisia and Egypt during the Arab Spring. He was eventually fired for drawing comparisons between the economic conditions in Egypt and  Malawi in a political science class. This prompted protests from the UNIMA students and faculty that stood in solidarity with Chisanga including Kabwila-Kapasula. It also led to the eventual closure of the universities at Chancellor College and Polytechnic.  As a condition to return to class, the academics asked for an official apology from the police chief, Peter Mukhito and assurances of respect for academic freedom. Mukhito declared that academic freedom had to be balanced with issues of national security. This statement was backed by President Bingu wa Mutharika who urged him not to apologize. Mutharika ordered them to return to work but the lecturers refused since there was no grantee of freedom. The government was unable to provide this under the leadership of The Minister of Education, Peter Mutharika. The students stood in solidarity with the fired faculty which resulted in the use of teargas to disperse students. The failure to resolve this matter and a standoff occurred between lecturers and students on one side, and the President of Malawi, Bingu wa Mutharika.

Harassment and Death Threats
Since the incident she has reported that she has been denied a passport renewal by the government and has received harassing phone calls and death threats.

Court Case
The lecturers have taken the government to court in order to ensure academic freedom and non interference by the police in academia.

Support of Academic Freedom
Many Malawian organizations are showing their support to guarantee academic freedom including the Malawi Law Society and Malawi Congress oTrade Unions. Students at Binghamton University (SUNY), Kabwila-Kapasula's alma mater, have urged Amnesty International to take up this case.

Student Activist Death
She attended the funeral of Polytechnic student Robert Chasowa, a Malawian student at the same university that was an active student activist Youth for Freedom and Democracy (YFD), a student activist group. Kabwila-Kapasula dressed in red clothes with a red cloth around his mouth to symbolize the silencing of students under the Bingu wa Mutharika administration.

Politics

She is current member of parliament for Salima North west constituency under Malawi Congress Party.

References

Academic staff of the University of Malawi
Malawian feminists
Living people
Year of birth missing (living people)
Members of the National Assembly (Malawi)
Malawian women's rights activists